René Concepcion (born 30 January 1969) is a Filipino swimmer. He competed in four events at the 1988 Summer Olympics.

References

1969 births
Living people
Filipino male swimmers
Olympic swimmers of the Philippines
Swimmers at the 1988 Summer Olympics
Place of birth missing (living people)
Southeast Asian Games medalists in swimming
Southeast Asian Games gold medalists for the Philippines
Southeast Asian Games silver medalists for the Philippines
Southeast Asian Games bronze medalists for the Philippines
Competitors at the 1985 Southeast Asian Games
20th-century Filipino people
21st-century Filipino people